Achmed Labasanov (born April 24, 1978) is a former Chechen-Russian mixed martial artist who competed as a heavyweight between 1998 and 2002. During his career he has fought for organisations such as Fighting Network RINGS, IAFC - Absolute Fighting Championship and Pride FC.



Biography

IAFC
Labasanov made his Mixed martial arts debut in Moscow, Russia at 'IAFC - Pankration European Championship 1998' on 23 May 1998, defeating Denis Shibankov by submission. He later defeated Zabir Elbiev by TKO at 'IAFC - Pankration Russian Championship 1999' on 30 April 1999. The following year, he defeated Vyacheslav Kiselev by submission at 'IAFC - Pankration World Championship 2000 [Day 1]' on 28 April 2000. Labasanov's last appearance for the Russian organisation 'IAFC' was on 8 February 2001 Yaroslavl, Russia, losing to Islam Dadalov by decision.

RINGS
Achmed Labasanov competed in the first 'King of Kings' tournament held by RINGS in Tokyo, Japan. On 28 October 1999 at Rings: King of Kings 1999 Block A, he was eliminated in his opening match to British fighter, Lee Hasdell by second round TKO. Labasanov then competed for RINGS Russia in 2000, winning three bouts in a row, defeating Valentijn Overeem, Kozhedar Baladiev and Vepcho Bardanashvili, all by first round submission. On 9 October 2000, he lost to Brazilian Antonio Rodrigo Nogueira by submission in the round of 32 at Rings: King of Kings 2000 Block A. On 10 November 2001, Labasanov beat Mindaugas Kulikauskas by decision at Rings Lithuania: Bushido Rings 3.

BARS
Labasanov had two bouts under the 'BARS' promotion held in Moscow, Russia. He defeated Stanislav Nuschik by TKO on 30 May 2001 and later lost to Andrey Juravkov by decision on 1 November 2001.

Pride
Labasanov's final fight was against Gary Goodridge at Pride 21 on 23 June 2002, losing by split decision.

Mixed martial arts record

|-
| Loss
| align=center| 8–5
| Gary Goodridge
| Decision (split)
| PRIDE 21
| 
| align=center| 3
| align=center| 5:00
| Saitama, Japan
| 
|-
| Win
| align=center| 8–4
| Mindaugas Kulikauskas
| Decision
| Rings Lithuania: Bushido Rings 3
| 
| align=center| 2
| align=center| 5:00
| Vilnius, Lithuania
| 
|-
| Loss
| align=center| 7–4
| Andrey Juravkov
| Decision (decision)
| BARS - BARS
| 
| align=center| 3
| align=center| 
| Moscow, Russia
| 
|-
| Win
| align=center| 7–3
| Stanislav Nuschik
| TKO (punches)
| BARS - Moscow vs St. Petersburg
| 
| align=center| 2
| align=center| 
| Moscow, Russia
| 
|-
| Loss
| align=center| 6–3
| Islam Dadalov
| Decision
| IAFC - Pankration Russian Championship 2001
| 
| align=center| 
| align=center| 
| Yaroslavl, Russia
| 
|-
| Loss
| align=center| 6–2
| Antônio Rodrigo Nogueira
| Submission (armbar)
| Rings: King of Kings 2000 Block A
| 
| align=center| 1
| align=center| 1:38
| Tokyo, Japan
| Round of 32.
|-
| Win
| align=center| 6–1
| Vepcho Bardanashvili
| Submission (achilles lock)
| Rings: Russia vs. Georgia
| 
| align=center| 1
| align=center| 1:28
| Ekaterinburg, Russia
| 
|-
| Win
| align=center| 5–1
| Kozhedar Baladiev
| Submission (armbar)
| Rings Russia: Russia vs. Bulgaria
| 
| align=center| 1
| align=center| 
| Tula, Russia
|
|-
| Win
| align=center| 4–1
| Valentijn Overeem
| Submission (achilles lock)
| Rings Russia: Russia vs. The World
| 
| align=center| 1
| align=center| 3:50
| Ekaterinburg, Russia
| 
|-
| Win
| align=center| 3–1
| Vyacheslav Kiselyov
| Submission (armbar)
| IAFC - Pankration World Championship 2000 [Day 1]
| 
| align=center| 1
| align=center| 1:26
| Moscow, Russia
| 
|-
| Loss
| align=center| 2–1
| Lee Hasdell
| TKO (kick)
| Rings: King of Kings 1999 Block A
| 
| align=center| 2
| align=center| 3:33
| Tokyo, Japan
| Round of 32.
|-
| Win
| align=center| 2–0
| Zabir Elbiev
| TKO (doctor stoppage)
| IAFC - Pankration Russian Championship 1999
| 
| align=center| 1
| align=center| 4:38
| Russia
| 
|-
| Win
| align=center| 1–0
| Denis Shibankov
| Submission (strikes)
| IAFC - Pankration European Championship 1998
| 
| align=center| 1
| align=center| 4:21
| Moscow, Russia
|

References

External links

1978 births
Living people
Russian male mixed martial artists
Dagestani mixed martial artists
Heavyweight mixed martial artists
Mixed martial artists utilizing sambo
Russian sambo practitioners
Sportspeople from Dagestan